CBA Finals may refer to:

Chinese Basketball Association Finals
List of Continental Basketball Association champions